Arkansas Highway 280 is a state highway in Clay and Greene Counties. The route runs  from Arkansas Highway 90 near Delaplaine north then east to AR 90 in Peach Orchard. It does not intersect any other state highways.

Route description
AR 280 begins at AR 90 and heads due north to Brookings. The highway is located near the Dave Donaldson/Black River Wildlife Management Area.

History
The route first became a state highway in 1963. AR 208S/AR 208 from Brookings to AR 90 was paved upon addition to the state highway system.

Major intersections

Brookings spur

Arkansas Highway 280 Spur is a  spur route to the unincorporated community of Brookings in Clay County.

Major intersections

See also

 List of state highways in Arkansas

References

External links

280
Transportation in Clay County, Arkansas
Transportation in Greene County, Arkansas